The 2003 Liga Perdana 2 season is the sixth and final season of Liga Perdana 2. A total of 12 teams participated in the season.

Kuala Lumpur and Negeri Sembilan were relegated from Liga Perdana 1 to join the Liga Perdana 2. 

The season kicked off on 10 February 2003. Public Bank won the title and the playoff for the newly formed top-tier league in Malaysia, the Malaysia Super League.

Teams

12 teams competing in the sixth season of Liga Perdana 2.

 Public Bank (2003 Liga Perdana 2 champions)
 Negeri Sembilan
 Johor
 MPPJ FC
 Brunei
 Kuala Lumpur
 Kelantan SKMK
 PDRM
 Kelantan TNB
 ATM
 Kelantan JPS
 Perak TKN

League table

1.Public Bank  - 53 PTS (2003 Liga Perdana 2 Champions)

2.Negeri Sembilan  - 42 PTS (Promotion Play-Off) (Stay in the league)

3.Johor  - 40 PTS (Promotion Play-Off) (Stay in the league)

4.MPPJ FC  - 39 PTS (Promotion Play-Off) (Stay in the league)

5.Brunei  - 39 PTS

6.Kuala Lumpur  - 31 PTS

7.Kelantan SKMK  - 31 PTS

8.PDRM  - 28 PTS

9.Kelantan TNB  - 24 PTS

10.ATM  - 19 PTS

11.Kelantan JPS  - 18 PTS

12.Perak TKN  - 5 PTS

Champions

References

Liga Perdana 2 seasons
1
Malaysia